"Shake a Leg" is a song by Roll Deep. It was released on 10 October 2005 in the UK and managed to peak to number 24 in the UK Singles Chart. The song's instrumental samples "The Mambo Craze" by De-Phazz.

Track listing
Digital download
"Shake a Leg" (Radio Edit) – 2:47
"Heat Up" – 4:01

Chart performance

References

2005 singles
Roll Deep songs
2005 songs
Songs written by Wiley (musician)